SpeculatorS (Bulgarian: Борсови играчи) is a 2022 Bulgarian thriller drama film directed by Georgi D. Kostov and written by Aleksandar Chobanov & Scarlatov. Starring Aleksandar Aleksiev, Daniel Angelov, Darin Angelov and Pavela Apostolova. The film was named on the shortlist for Bulgarian's entry for the Academy Award for Best International Feature Film at the 95th Academy Awards, but it was not selected. It was considered again when Mother was disqualified, however, it was not selected.

Synopsis 
Victor Angelov, a young finance professor at a top-tier Bulgarian university. His girlfriend Nikol is not happy with their relationship and she starts an affair with the highly successful box fighter Deyan. Crushed by her betrayal, Victor takes a new job at the brokerage company owned by his late father's partner, so that he can try to have Nikol back.

Cast 
The actors participating in this film are:

 Aleksandar Aleksiev as Victor Angelov
 Daniel Angelov as Stamen
 Boryana Bratoeva as Nicole
 Darin Angelov as Deyan Valkanov
 Marian Valev as Kamen
 Dimitar Banenkin as Ranghel Valkanov
 Radina Kardjilova as Ralitza Raykova

Release 
The official domestic release of the film was on May 20, 2022. It then had a premiere on September 28, 2022, at the Golden Rose Film Festival.

References

External links 

 

2022 films
2022 thriller drama films
Bulgarian thriller drama films
2020s Bulgarian-language films
2020s English-language films
Films set in Bulgaria
Films shot in Bulgaria
Films about finance